Jan de Doot is the subject of a painting from 1655 by Carel van Savoyen. It shows De Doot, a smith, holding in one hand a kitchen knife, and in the other a large bladder stone the size and shape of an egg, set in gold. This 17th-century Dutch blacksmith is said to have performed a successful lithotomy on himself in 1651. The painting is part of the Portrait Collection of the Laboratory of Pathology, which is part of the University of Leiden.

Background story

The story on which the painting is based is from Nicolaes Tulp's book entitled Observationes medicae (1672 edition). In this book, which is a list of 230 'cases' from the Amsterdam practice of Dr. Tulp, the smith is named Joannes Lethaeus, which was a Latinized version of De Doot's name (doot means "dead" in Dutch). It is not clear from the story if he lived long afterwards.

Here is the text:

Observations, Book IV, Chapter 31. Wherein a patient cuts a stone out of himself.

Doot apparently suffered from the intolerable pain that is caused by a bladder stone. According to date of the portrait, he survived at least until 5 years after the book came out, but the Latin Lethaeus means "of the underworld" and Dutch de doot means "the death", could also indicate that he had already died.

Murphy doubts the details of the story. He points out that De Doot had previously had two stones removed from his bladder. Therefore, the stone may have extruded through the former incisions into the subcutaneous tissue, from which it would have been far easier for De Doot to remove it.

References

Further reading
 Ioannes Lethaeus, Faber ferrarius in Latin version Observationes Medicae (Tulp) on Google Books (with illustration)
 Een zieke zichzelf van de steen snijdende in Dutch version Observationes Medicae on Google books
 Newman, Art (1988). The Illustrated Treasury of Medical Curiosa. McGraw-Hill, Inc. New York, New York.

External links

 Illustrations from Medical Observations by N. Tulpius (dead link, archive)

17th-century Dutch people
History of Amsterdam
Dutch Golden Age paintings
Blacksmiths